Engkilili may refer to:
Engkilili
Engkilili (state constituency), represented in the Sarawak State Legislative Assembly